In computer science and optimization theory, the max-flow min-cut theorem states that in a flow network, the maximum amount of flow passing from the source to the sink is equal to the total weight of the edges in a minimum cut, i.e., the smallest total weight of the edges which if removed would disconnect the source from the sink.

This is a special case of the duality theorem for linear programs and can be used to derive Menger's theorem and the Kőnig–Egerváry theorem.

Definitions and statement

The theorem equates two quantities: the maximum flow through a network, and the minimum capacity of a cut of the network. To state the theorem, each of these notions must first be defined.

Network

A network consists of 
 a source  and a sink ;
It represents the maximum amount of flow that can pass through an edge.

Flows 
 Capacity Constraint: For every edge , 

A flow can be visualized as a physical flow of a fluid through the network, following the direction of each edge. The capacity constraint then says that the volume flowing through each edge per unit time is less than or equal to the maximum capacity of the edge, and the conservation constraint says that the amount that flows into each vertex equals the amount flowing out of each vertex, apart from the source and sink vertices. 

The value of a flow is defined by 

 

In the fluid analogy, it represents the amount of fluid entering the network at the source. Because of the conservation axiom for flows, this is the same as the amount of flow leaving the network at the sink. 

The maximum flow problem asks for the largest flow on a given network. 
Maximum Flow Problem.

Cuts 
The other half of the max-flow min-cut theorem refers to a different aspect of a network: the collection of cuts. That is, an s-t cut is a division of the vertices of the network into two parts, with the source in one part and the sink in the other. The cut-set  of a cut  is the set of edges that connect the source part of the cut to the sink part:

The capacity of an s-t cut is the sum of the capacities of the edges in its cut-set,
 

There are typically many cuts in a graph, but cuts with smaller weights are often more difficult to find. 

Minimum s-t Cut Problem. Minimize , that is, determine  and  such that the capacity of the s-t cut is minimal.

Main theorem 
In the above situation, one can prove that the value of any flow through a network is less than or equal to the capacity of any s-t cut, and that furthermore a flow with maximal value and a cut with minimal capacity exist. The main theorem links the maximum flow value with the minimum cut capacity of the network.

 Max-flow min-cut theorem. The maximum value of an s-t flow is equal to the minimum capacity over all s-t cuts.

Example

The figure on the right shows a flow in a network. The numerical annotation on each arrow, in the form f/c, indicates the flow (f) and the capacity (c) of the arrow. The flows emanating from the source total five (2+3=5), as do the flows into the sink (2+3=5), establishing that the flow's value is 5. 

One s-t cut with value 5 is given by S={s,p} and T={o, q, r, t}. The capacities of the edges that cross this cut are 3 and 2, giving a cut capacity of 3+2=5. (The arrow from o to p is not considered, as it points from T back to S.) 

The value of the flow is equal to the capacity of the cut, showing that the flow is a maximal flow and the cut is a minimal cut.

Note that the flow through each of the two arrows that connect S to T is at full capacity; this is always the case: a minimal cut represents a 'bottleneck' of the system.

Linear program formulation
The max-flow problem and min-cut problem can be formulated as two primal-dual linear programs.

The max-flow LP is straightforward. The dual LP is obtained using the algorithm described in dual linear program: the variables and sign constraints of the dual correspond to the constraints of the primal, and the constraints of the dual correspond to the variables and sign constraints of the primal. The resulting LP requires some explanation. The interpretation of the variables in the min-cut LP is:

 

The minimization objective sums the capacity over all the edges that are contained in the cut.

The constraints guarantee that the variables indeed represent a legal cut:

 The constraints  (equivalent to ) guarantee that, for non-terminal nodes u,v, if u is in S and v is in T, then the edge (u,v) is counted in the cut.
 The constraints  (equivalent to ) guarantee that, if v is in T, then the edge (s,v) is counted in the cut (since s is by definition in S).
 The constraints  (equivalent to ) guarantee that, if u is in S, then the edge (u,t) is counted in the cut (since t is by definition in T).

Note that, since this is a minimization problem, we do not have to guarantee that an edge is not in the cut - we only have to guarantee that each edge that should be in the cut, is summed in the objective function.

The equality in the max-flow min-cut theorem follows from the strong duality theorem in linear programming, which states that if the primal program has an optimal solution, x*, then the dual program also has an optimal solution, y*, such that the optimal values formed by the two solutions are equal.

Application

Cederbaum's maximum flow theorem

The maximum flow problem can be formulated as the maximization of the electrical current through a network composed of nonlinear resistive elements. In this formulation, the limit of the current  between the input terminals of the electrical network as the input voltage  approaches , is equal to the weight of the minimum-weight cut set.

Generalized max-flow min-cut theorem

In other words, the amount of flow passing through a vertex cannot exceed its capacity. Define an s-t cut to be the set of vertices and edges such that for any path from s to t, the path contains a member of the cut. In this case, the capacity of the cut is the sum the capacity of each edge and vertex in it.

In this new definition, the generalized max-flow min-cut theorem states that the maximum value of an s-t flow is equal to the minimum capacity of an s-t cut in the new sense.

Menger's theorem

The Menger's theorem states that the maximum number of edge-disjoint s-t paths in an undirected graph is equal to the minimum number of edges in an s-t cut-set.

Project selection problem

In the project selection problem, there are  projects and  machines. Each project  yields revenue  and each machine  costs  to purchase. Each project requires a number of machines and each machine can be shared by several projects. The problem is to determine which projects and machines should be selected and purchased respectively, so that the profit is maximized.

Let  be the set of projects not selected and  be the set of machines purchased, then the problem can be formulated as,

The above minimization problem can then be formulated as a minimum-cut problem by constructing a network, where the source is connected to the projects with capacity , and the sink is connected by the machines with capacity . An edge  with infinite capacity is added if project  requires machine . By the max-flow min-cut theorem, one can solve the problem as a maximum flow problem.

The figure on the right gives a network formulation of the following project selection problem:

The idea here is to 'flow' each project's profits through the 'pipes' of its machines. If we cannot fill the pipe from a machine, the machine's return is less than its cost, and the min cut algorithm will find it cheaper to cut the project's profit edge instead of the machine's cost edge.

Image segmentation problem

In the image segmentation problem, there are  pixels. Each pixel  can be assigned a foreground value  or a background value . There is a penalty of  if pixels  are adjacent and have different assignments. The problem is to assign pixels to foreground or background such that the sum of their values minus the penalties is maximum.

Let  be the set of pixels assigned to foreground and  be the set of points assigned to background, then the problem can be formulated as,

 

This maximization problem can be formulated as a minimization problem instead, that is,

 

The above minimization problem can be formulated as a minimum-cut problem by constructing a network where the source (orange node) is connected to all the pixels with capacity , and the sink (purple node) is connected by all the pixels with capacity .

History
An account of the discovery of the theorem was given by Ford and Fulkerson in 1962:

"Determining a maximal steady state flow from one point to another in a network subject to capacity limitations on arcs ... was posed to the authors in the spring of 1955 by T.E. Harris, who, in conjunction with General F. S. Ross (Ret.) had formulated a simplified model of railway traffic flow, and pinpointed this particular problem as the central one suggested by the model. It was not long after this until the main result, Theorem 5.1, which we call the max-flow min-cut theorem, was conjectured and established. A number of proofs have since appeared."

Proof

 : the set of remaining vertices i.e. 

Claim. , where the capacity of an s-t cut is defined by 
.

Now, we know,  for any subset of vertices, . Therefore, for  we need:
 All outgoing edges from the cut must be fully saturated.
 All incoming edges to the cut must have zero flow.

To prove the above claim we consider two cases:

In , there exists an outgoing edge  such that it is not saturated, i.e., . Hence, any outgoing edge  is fully saturated.

In , there exists an incoming edge  such that it carries some non-zero flow, i.e., . Hence, any incoming edge  must have zero flow.

Both of the above statements prove that the capacity of cut obtained in the above described manner is equal to the flow obtained in the network. Also, the flow was obtained by Ford-Fulkerson algorithm, so it is the max-flow of the network as well.

Also, since any flow in the network is always less than or equal to capacity of every cut possible in a network, the above described cut is also the min-cut which obtains the max-flow.

A corollary from this proof is that the maximum flow through any set of edges in a cut of a graph is equal to the minimum capacity of all previous cuts.

See also
 GNRS conjecture
 Linear programming
 Maximum flow
 Minimum cut
 Flow network
 Edmonds–Karp algorithm
 Ford–Fulkerson algorithm
 Approximate max-flow min-cut theorem
 Menger's theorem

References

 
 
 

Combinatorial optimization
Theorems in graph theory
Network flow problem